Alnwick Hall is a historic manor in Morris Township, New Jersey. It was built in 1904 for Edward P. Meany, legal counsel for the American Telephone and Telegraph Company, Judge Advocate General of New Jersey and Vice President of the New Mexico Central and Southern Railway. It was designed to resemble Alnwick Castle by architect Percy Griffin. It has been listed on the National Register of Historic Places since April 11, 1985.

References

National Register of Historic Places in Morris County, New Jersey
Gothic Revival architecture in New Jersey
Houses completed in 1904
Houses in Morris County, New Jersey
Morris Township, New Jersey